Eucopiidae is a family of crustaceans belonging to the order Lophogastrida.

Genera:
 Eucopia Dana, 1852
 Schimperella Bill, 1914
 Vicluvia Larghi, Tintori, Basso, Danini & Felber, 2019
 Yunnanocopia Feldmann, Schweitzer, Hu, Huang, Zhou, Zhang, Wen, Xie, Schram & Jones, 2016

References

Lophogastrida